Ricardo Rey (born 1910, date of death unknown) was an Argentine wrestler. He competed in the men's Greco-Roman featherweight at the 1928 Summer Olympics.

References

External links
 

1910 births
Year of death missing
Argentine male sport wrestlers
Olympic wrestlers of Argentina
Wrestlers at the 1928 Summer Olympics
Place of birth missing
20th-century Argentine people
21st-century Argentine people